The Victory Medal (also called the Inter-Allied Victory Medal) is a United Kingdom and British Empire First World War campaign medal.

The award of a common allied campaign medal was recommended by an inter-allied committee in March 1919. Each allied nation would design a 'Victory Medal' for award to their own nationals, all issues having certain common features, including a winged figure of victory on the obverse and the same ribbon. Fourteen countries finally awarded the medal.

Eligibility
The Victory Medal (United Kingdom) was issued to all those who received the 1914 Star or the 1914–15 Star, and to most of those who were awarded the British War Medal. It was not awarded singly.

To qualify, recipients need to have served in the armed forces of the United Kingdom or the British Empire, or with certain recognised voluntary organisations, and have entered any theatre of war between 5 August 1914 and 11 November 1918. While home service did not count, United Kingdom based members of the RAF who were actively engaged in the air against the enemy did qualify, as did those who flew new planes to France. Women qualified for this and other First World War campaign medals while serving in nursing and auxiliary forces in a theatre of war.

It was also awarded for mine clearance in the North Sea between 11 November 1918 and 30 November 1919 and for participation in the Allied intervention in the Russian Civil War up to 1 July 1920.

Description

While originally to be of dull bronze, the final award had a clear lacquer coating, giving it a bright finish. It was designed by William McMillan.

 The obverse shows the winged, full-length, full-front, figure of 'Victory' (or 'Victoria') with her left arm extended and holding a palm branch in her right hand, similar to the statue surmounting the Queen Victoria Memorial, in front of Buckingham Palace in London.
 The reverse has the words "THE GREAT / WAR FOR / CIVILISATION / 1914–1919" in four lines, all surrounded by a laurel wreath.
It attaches to the medal through a ring suspender.
 The recipient's name, rank, service number and unit were impressed on the edge of the medal. The name of the regiment or corps was omitted on medals awarded to Army officers.
 Those mentioned in despatches between 4 August 1914 and 10 August 1920 wear a bronze oak leaf spray on the medal's ribbon, with a smaller version on the ribbon bar when medals were not worn.

Nicknames
The three First World War medals, either one of the 1914 Star or the 1914–15 Star, the British War Medal and the Victory Medal, were collectively irreverently referred to as Pip, Squeak and Wilfred, after three comic strip characters, a dog, a penguin and a rabbit, which were popular in the immediate post-war era. Pip represented either of the two Stars, Squeak represented the British War Medal and Wilfred represented the Victory Medal.

When only the British War Medal and Victory Medal were worn together, they were referred to as Mutt and Jeff, after contemporary newspaper comic strip characters.

Order of wear
The order of wear of medals awarded for service during the First World War is as follows:
 1914 Star
 1914–15 Star
 British War Medal
 Mercantile Marine War Medal
 Victory Medal
 Territorial Force War Medal

International award
In March 1919 a committee in Paris comprising representatives from the various allied powers recommended the award of an inter-allied campaign medal of common design, thereby avoiding the need for allied nations to exchange campaign medals. Each allied country designed its own version, following certain common criteria. The medal was to be in bronze with a 36 mm diameter, having a winged figure of victory on the obverse, a common inscription on the reverse and suspension by a double rainbow design ribbon. Japan and Siam replaced the figure of victory, since a winged victory symbol was not culturally relevant.

The following versions were finally awarded:

See also
Lists of abbreviations used on Commonwealth World War I medals
Australian campaign medals
British campaign medals
New Zealand campaign medals
Silver War Badge (SWB)

References

Bibliography

External links

Victory Medal on the UK Parliament website
Transcription of Admiralty and Military orders for the VM hosted on the Australian DoD website

Searchable database of medal cards at The National Archives

Decorations of the British Army
British campaign medals
Australian campaign medals
New Zealand campaign medals
Interallied Victory Medals of World War I
Awards established in 1919